Christiaan Boyce Kok (born 2 October 1971 in Gatooma (now Kadoma), Mashonaland) is a Zimbabwean first-class cricketer who played for Young Mashonaland cricket team. He is right-handed wicket-keeper batsman

References

External links
 
 

1971 births
Living people
Zimbabwean cricketers
Sportspeople from Harare
Sportspeople from Kadoma, Zimbabwe
Wicket-keepers